NA-82 Sargodha-I is a constituency for the National Assembly of Pakistan.

Members of Parliament

1988—2002: NA-47 Sargodha-I

2002-2018: NA-64 Sargodha-I

2018-2022: NA-88 Sargodha-I

Election 2002 

General elections were held on 10 Oct 2002. Inam-ul-Haq Paracha of Pakistan Peoples Party Parliamentarian (PPPP) won by 69,815 votes.

Election 2008 

The result of general election 2008 in this constituency is given below.

Result 
Nadeem Afzal Gondal succeeded in the election 2008 and became the member of National Assembly.

Election 2013 

General elections were held on 11 May 2013. Shaykh Muhammad Amin al-Hasanat Shah of PML-N succeeded in the elections with 151,690 votes and became the member of National Assembly.

Election 2018 
General elections were held on 25 July 2018.

See also
NA-81 Hafizabad
NA-83 Sargodha-II

References

External links 
Election result's official website

NA-064